Christine Ayanda Botlogetswe (born 1 October 1995) is a sprinter from Botswana who competes primarily in the 400 metres.  She competed at the 2016 Olympics, running a non-qualifying 52.37 in the first round.  She runs for the Orapa Athletics Club and is coached by Justice Dipeba, who also coaches Isaac Makwala, the seventh fastest man in history.

She qualified to represent Botswana at the 2020 Summer Olympics.

International competitions

Personal bests
Outdoor
200 metres – 25.75 (+0.2 m/s, Marrakesh 2014)
400 metres – 51.17 (Gold Coast 2018)

References

External links
 
 Video of Botlogetswe running lead off leg for Botswana at the 2015 Penn Relays

1995 births
Living people
Botswana female sprinters
Athletes (track and field) at the 2015 African Games
Athletes (track and field) at the 2016 Summer Olympics
Athletes (track and field) at the 2020 Summer Olympics
Athletes (track and field) at the 2018 Commonwealth Games
Olympic athletes of Botswana
African Games silver medalists for Botswana
African Games medalists in athletics (track and field)
Commonwealth Games medallists in athletics
Commonwealth Games bronze medallists for Botswana
Olympic female sprinters
Medallists at the 2018 Commonwealth Games